Events in the year 1950 in Portugal.

Incumbents
President: Óscar Carmona
Prime Minister: António de Oliveira Salazar

Events
The Pracana Dam completed.

Arts and entertainment

Sports
Aliados Lordelo F.C. founded
A.D. Carregado founded
F.C. Paços de Ferreira founded
G.D. Igreja Nova founded

Births
Paulo Branco, film producer.
Pedro Caldeira Cabral, musician
Fernando Nogueira, politician
Gerardo Ribeiro, violinist

Deaths

29 September – Duarte Leite, historian, mathematician, journalist, diplomat and politician (born 1864)
14 October – António Maria da Silva, engineer and politician (born 1872)

References

 
1950s in Portugal
Portugal
Years of the 20th century in Portugal
Portugal